Live Box is a set of 4 live CDs, a live DVD and a 36-page booklet by Icelandic musician Björk, released in August 2003. Each live CD roughly corresponds to one album in her (at the time of release) four album solo discography.  The 4 live CDs were later released separately in June 2004

Background
When Björk was pregnant with her daughter Ísadóra in 2002 she decided to start sorting through the hundreds of hours of live recordings she had collected from her tours. Assisted in the process by the head of Smekkleysa, Ásmundur Jónsson, they decided on the best performances from each of the tours to include on the live albums. This release of live material was initially confirmed by the inclusion of live tracks on the "It's in Our Hands" single in 2002, credited to the "Forthcoming album Vespertine Live". This was followed by an announcement in 2003 of a distribution-deal with US record company Navarre that would include "both CDs and DVDs". Björk's official website later confirmed the release of a box set containing live recordings, not only from Vespertine but from the past ten years of Björk's solo career. Björk only started to have soundboard recordings of her live shows from the Homogenic Tour onwards, so the first two discs (Debut Live and Post Live) are made up primarily of the audio from the corresponding live DVDs. Shortly before the official release, a free download of "Hyperballad" from the Post Live disc was made available on the Abercrombie Vintage website. The originally announced track listing for Post Live included 18 tracks (the final version has 13), and so would have included nearly the full audio from the Live at Shepherds Bush Empire DVD, from which the album takes most of its material.

The box set also includes a 36-page booklet featuring numerous photos and an in-depth conversation with Björk and Ásmundur in Björk's home, discussing her career, her recordings and her live tours. The box set was originally announced as a limited release of 30,000 copies, although it is still available for purchase. The individual live discs were later released separately in May 2004.

Artwork
The artwork was designed by M/M Paris, whom Björk has worked extensively with since 1999's Volumen release. At the time of release many online stores displayed an incorrect earlier version of the artwork for the box set, which features alternate artwork for the Post Live and Homogenic Live albums. For the album artwork of each live album, Björk herself found a selection of different photos available on the Internet. Because of the small resolution of the images chosen for Homogenic Live and Vespertine Live, these appear pixelated on the actual album covers.

Live Book
To accompany the release of the Live Box, a separate book was released titled Live Book. This features the interview with Ásmundur Jónsson that is also included in the 36-page booklet that comes with the Live Box, but also new interviews with Lynn Fox, Zeena Parkins, Matmos and Leila, who were all involved in Björk's 2003 tour. Although now largely out of print, the book is still available for purchase at the official Björk online store.

Track listing

Charts

References

External links
 Live Box mini-site

Björk albums
2003 live albums
Music video compilation albums
2003 video albums
2003 compilation albums
One Little Independent Records compilation albums
One Little Independent Records live albums
One Little Independent Records video albums
Albums produced by Björk